Lionel Newman (January 4, 1916 – February 3, 1989) was an American conductor, pianist, and film and television composer. He won the Academy Award for Best Score of a Musical Picture for Hello Dolly! with Lennie Hayton in 1969. He is the brother of Alfred Newman and Emil Newman, uncle of composers Randy Newman, David Newman, Thomas Newman, Maria Newman, and grandfather of Joey Newman. His 11 nominations contribute to the Newmans being the most nominated Academy Award extended family, with a collective 92 nominations in various music categories.

Biography

Early life
Born in New Haven, Connecticut, United States, Newman was one of ten children, the youngest of seven boys, born to Russian-Jewish immigrant parents. While the family had little money, the children's mother, Luba, was a strong woman who encouraged them to achieve. Newman migrated to Hollywood where, at the age of 16, he began conducting for impresario Earl Carroll. This was where he met his future wife, Beverly Carroll, an Earl Carroll Vanities showgirl, and niece of the impresario.  Newman had formal training in New York, and after moving to Los Angeles, he continued his studies with Joseph Achron and Mario Castelnuovo-Tedesco.
 
In the 1930s, Newman earned his stripes conducting national tours and working as the piano accompanist for Mae West. She used to scold him for holding his hands too high in the pit saying, "I'm the show, Newman, not you." 
 
At the age of 18, he obtained a job playing piano on the Holland America ocean liner, the S.S.Rotterdam, with his "Newman's Society Orchestra". This trip had great significance for him; he had always wanted to make another such trip to find his mother's home.

Career at 20th Century Fox
After serving an apprenticeship conducting and orchestrating live shows, Newman joined 20th Century Fox as a rehearsal pianist under the guidance of his brother, Alfred Newman, and by 1959, he had been promoted to Musical Director for Television there. This opened the doors to feature films. He was soon made vice president in charge of music for both television and features. This resulted in a promotion in 1982 to senior vice president of all music for Twentieth Century Fox Films. He wrote several classic TV themes for Fox, including The Many Loves of Dobie Gillis, Adventures in Paradise, and Daniel Boone. He also composed the 1981 and 1982 Fanfare for Fox. 
 
Lionel Newman's tenure with Twentieth Century Fox spanned 46 years with over 200 films to his credit, including How to Marry a Millionaire, North To Alaska, The Proud Ones, Road House, and Love Me Tender (Elvis Presley's first picture). He was musical director for all of Marilyn Monroe's films at Fox, in accordance with her request, including Gentlemen Prefer Blondes, There's No Business Like Show Business, River of No Return, and Let's Make Love, with the exception of Bus Stop which was directed and conducted by his brother, Alfred Newman and There's No Business Like Show Business which was co-directed and co-conducted by Alfred Newman.

In November 2013, the Twentieth Century Fox Music Department was dedicated as “The Lionel Newman Music Building,” and a bronze plaque of Lionel, listing his composition and conducting credits was unveiled.  Speaking to guests about Lionel's impact on film and television music, who he was as a friend, mentor and boss, and who he was as a family man were Steven Spielberg, John Williams, Lionel’s nephew, composer Randy Newman, and his grandson, Joey Newman.  The dedication was attended by several hundred people, including his family beyond Randy and Joey.

Awards and nominations
He received eleven Academy Award nominations, and won an Oscar for Hello Dolly! with Lennie Hayton in 1969. He conducted the scores for Cleopatra, The Sand Pebbles, The Agony and the Ecstasy, The Long Hot Summer, The Young Lions, Alien, and The Omen. He was the musical supervisor for Star Wars, The Empire Strikes Back, Return of the Jedi, Monsignor, and The Fury. Although he did not consider himself a songwriter, he received a certificate of merit from Broadcast Music Incorporated (BMI) for over one million network performances of his 1948 hit, "Again", a pop standard that lived on long after its introduction in the film Road House.

Work with other composers
Newman's wit and humor were famous around the film capital. Frank Sinatra, in his biography, called Newman one of the funniest men in Hollywood. Jerry Goldsmith recalls in his biography how Newman used to call him "Gorgeous".  Goldsmith also recounts that Newman nicknamed John Williams "Little Dimitri", after Dimitri Tiomkin.

Newman was a perfectionist, always making "just one more take" if some little detail could be improved. He wanted the Twentieth Century Fox Orchestra to reach the level of a great symphony orchestra, and it did, especially when he conducted. He was instrumental in the careers of John Williams, Jerry Goldsmith, Dominic Frontiere, Pat Williams, and many more.

Personal life
Newman was married to Beverly Carroll, who died October 21, 2010, and with whom he had three daughters. Carroll Newman, television producer, is married to Emmy Award winning actor and writer Gary Frank and they have one daughter Jessica Marli Frank, who is a producer at Tumblr; Deborah Newman Sharpe, VP, Sharpe and Associates, is married to Robert Sharpe, Owner, Sharpe and Associates located in Tucson, AZ. They have three children; Sarah Newman (Independent Casting Director), Jennifer Newman Sharpe, Esq. (Law Offices of Jennifer Newman Sharpe NYC), Jeremy Sharpe, Community Liaison Rancho Sahuarita, AZ;  and Jenifer Newman, a former professional ballet dancer and current Core Fusion teacher/National Trainer with Exhale Spa. She has one son, Joey Newman, a film and television composer/conductor married to Jerelyn Newman, Founder and Artistic Director of Westside Children's Theatre.  They have three daughters, Ella, Ava and Leah.

Later life
During the last few years of his tenure at Fox, Newman conducted major symphony orchestras in the United States, Canada, the UK, and New Zealand. Newman retired in 1985 and died on February 3, 1989, from cardiac arrest.

Filmography

Awards and nominations

References

External links

1916 births
1989 deaths
20th-century American composers
20th-century American conductors (music)
20th-century American male musicians
20th Century Studios people
American film score composers
American male conductors (music)
American male film score composers
American people of Russian-Jewish descent
American television composers
Best Original Music Score Academy Award winners
Classical musicians from California
Jewish American classical musicians
Jewish American film score composers
Jewish American television composers
Liberty Records artists
Male television composers
Musicians from New Haven, Connecticut
Lionel